Chloride intracellular channel protein 2 is a protein that in humans is encoded by the CLIC2 gene.

Chloride channels are a diverse group of proteins that regulate fundamental cellular processes including stabilization of cell membrane potential, transepithelial transport, maintenance of intracellular pH, and regulation of cell volume. Chloride intracellular channel 2 is a member of the p64 family; the protein is detected in fetal liver and adult skeletal muscle tissue.  This gene maps to the candidate region on chromosome X for incontinentia pigmenti.

See also
 Chloride channel

References

Further reading

External links
 
 

Ion channels